Christopher Parker (born 1983) is an English actor and television presenter.

Christopher Parker may also refer to:

Chris Parker (musician), American jazz drummer
Christopher Parker (MP), British Member of Parliament for Clitheroe, Lancashire, 1708–1713
Christopher J. Parker, executive director of the National Junior College Athletic Association

See also
Chris Parker (disambiguation)